is a professional Japanese baseball player. He plays infielder for the Tokyo Yakult Swallows.

External links

 NPB.com

1984 births
Living people
Baseball people from Osaka
Japanese baseball players
Nippon Professional Baseball infielders
Chunichi Dragons players
Tokyo Yakult Swallows players
Japanese baseball coaches
Nippon Professional Baseball coaches
Baseball people from Nagasaki Prefecture
People from Sasebo